Crossotus katbeh is a species of beetle in the family Cerambycidae. It was described by Sama in 1999. It is known from Jordan.

References

katbeh
Beetles described in 1999